Estadio Luis Valenzuela Hermosilla is a multi-use stadium in Copiapó, Chile.  It is currently used mostly for football matches and is the home ground of Club de Deportes Copiapó of the Chilean Primera División B.  It also hosted Regional Atacama of the Chilean Primera División.  The stadium has a capacity of 8,000 spectators.

References

External links
 Stadium information

Luis Valenzuela Hermosilla
Sports venues in Atacama Region
1960 establishments in Chile
Sports venues completed in 1960